Mehoopany Creek is a tributary of the Susquehanna River in Sullivan and Wyoming counties, Pennsylvania, in the United States. In Sullivan County the creek flows through Colley Township and in Wyoming County it flows through Forkston Township and Mehoopany Township. Its major tributaries include Stony Brook and North Fork Mehoopany Creek.

Mehoopany Creek is designated as a high-quality coldwater fishery in Sullivan County. Its headwaters are listed in the Sullivan County Natural Areas Inventory.

Course
Mehoopany Creek begins in Splashdam Pond in Colley Township, just west of the eastern border of Sullivan County. The creek flows north and then east. It leaves Sullivan County approximately a mile from its headwaters.

Upon leaving Sullivan County, Mehoopany Creek enters Forkstown Township, Wyoming County. In this township, it flows roughly east, entering a valley. It dips southeast, picking up the tributary Bellas Brook, and then flows in a northeasterly direction for several miles. Along the way, the creek passes Short Mountain and receives the tributary South Brook, along with numerous other tributaries. At Flat Top, it turns north for a few miles, receiving the tributary White Creek. The creek's valley becomes shallower and it receives the tributary North Fork Mehoopany Creek. It then turns northeast and enters Mehoopany Township. The creek meanders for several miles through this township before reaching its confluence with the Susquehanna River near the community of North Mehoopany.

Tributaries
Tributaries of Mehoopany Creek include Stony Brook, North Fork Mehoopany Creek, and numerous others.

Hydrology

Mehoopany Creek is acidic in early spring.

Geography and geology

The topography of the watershed of Mehoopany Creek is described as "rough and hilly" in a 1921 book. The creek's channel is sinuous. The creek has alluvial floodplains in its lower reaches.

Mehoopany Creek flows through rock formations of shale and sandstone.

Mehoopany Creek has "dangerously situated strainers" and major rapids in places.

Watershed
The watershed is in three counties: Sullivan County, Wyoming County, and Bradford County.

The watershed of Mehoopany Creek is forested. Lakes and swamps are present in its upper reaches. One lake in the watershed is Grant Lake, which has a surface area of 68.8 acres.

There are a number of communities in the watershed of Mehoopany Creek. In 1921, the largest were Mehoopany, with a population of 648; Ricketts, with a population of 275; and Forkston, with a population of 210. Major roads in the watershed include Pennsylvania Route 87.

History, etymology, and industries
A gauging station was established on Mehoopany Creek in January 1914.

Industries done in the watershed of Mehoopany Creek in the early 1900s included agriculture. The creek also provided water power for a number of mills. The Lehigh Valley Railroad also traversed the upper part of the watershed in this period. Logging has been done near the headwaters of the creek.

Biology
Mehoopany Creek and its drainage basin is designated as a high-quality coldwater fishery in Sullivan County. However, native trout are also present in the watershed, especially in the tributary Stony Brook.

The headwaters of Mehoopany Creek are "one of the two highest priority sites in the [Sullivan] county" according to their listing in the Sullivan County Natural Areas Inventory. These headwaters are a wetland complex, which contains several rare plant species. However, the wetlands are mostly dominated by blueberry plants.

The headwaters of Mehoopany Creek are home to three plant species that are rare or endangered in Pennsylvania.

Recreation
Mehoopany Creek is suitable for intermediate and novice canoers. The creek is easier to canoe on in its lower reaches than in its upper reaches and the scenery on the creek is described as "good". The American Whitewater Association's difficulty ranking of the creek ranges from I to III during normal flow conditions.

Mehoopany Creek flows through Pennsylvania State Game Lands in many places.

See also
Taques Creek, next tributary of the Susquehanna River going downstream
Little Mehoopany Creek, next tributary of the Susquehanna River going upstream
List of rivers of Pennsylvania

References

Rivers of Pennsylvania
Rivers of Sullivan County, Pennsylvania
Tributaries of the Susquehanna River
Rivers of Wyoming County, Pennsylvania